The Museum of Biblical Art (MBA) in Dallas, Texas, USA, exhibits art with a Biblical theme.

History
The museum was founded in 1967 by Mattie Caruth Byrd. It was formerly known as the Biblical Arts Center. In 2005, a fire destroyed the museum and 2,500 works of art. The museum rebuilt and reopened in 2010 in a modern building with eleven galleries and 30,000 square feet of exhibition and event space.

Collection

The museum holds and displays 2,500 works by artists including John Singer Sargent, Andy Warhol, Marc Chagall, Leonard Baskin, William Gropper, Jack Levine, Jacques Lipchitz, Ben Shahn and Max Weber, Gib Singleton as well as ceremonial art and over 100 Bibles.

National Center for Jewish Art
The National Center for Jewish Art was launched in October 2014, and occupies 10,000 square feet of the museum, showcasing its expanded Judaica collection. The inaugural exhibit featured the work of Barbara Hines. The museum was praised by the Texas Jewish Arts Association, but provoked some other members of the local Jewish community to voice misgivings that a museum with "clearly Christian roots" has won strong support among Jewish patrons of the arts and Jewish artists.

References

External links 

 Museum of Biblical Art official site
 Barbara Hines Exhibit at The Museum of Biblical Art, 2015

Museum of Biblical Art
Arts in Dallas
Museums in Dallas
Art museums and galleries in Texas
Religious museums in Texas
Art museums established in 1967
Bible-themed museums, zoos, and botanical gardens